St. Margaret's Bay may refer to:

In Canada
 St. Margarets Bay, Nova Scotia on the South Shore of Nova Scotia
 St. Margarets Bay, Nova Scotia (administrative district), a political division 
 Head of St. Margarets Bay, Nova Scotia

In England
 St. Margaret's Bay, Kent

See also
 St. Margaret Bay, Newfoundland